The 4th International 500-Mile Sweepstakes Race was held at the Indianapolis Motor Speedway on Saturday, May 30, 1914.

René Thomas was the race winner, accompanied by riding mechanic Robert Laly.

Background

Race history 

The Indianapolis Motor Speedway opened in 1909, and the first motorsport event at the track, a series of motorcycle races, was held in August of that year. A series of automobile races were held in 1909, but concerns were raised about the condition of the course after numerous accidents, including a fatality. The track was re-paved at a high-cost to Carl G. Fisher and the Indianapolis Motor Speedway Corporation, and further series of races took place in 1910. Fisher was worried about the dwindling attendances at these races, and decided to establish a 500-mile race; double the furthest distance of any previous race at the track. He went on to announce that the track would host no other races during the year, and that the prize for first place would be $25,000: more than 10 times higher than any other race. The total prize-fund was $85,000. Fisher's plans paid off, and at the 1911 Indianapolis 500, the inaugural event, newspapers reported that in excess of 80,000 people attended the race. Each of the first two races were won by Americans; Ray Harroun in 1911 and Joe Dawson in 1912. In 1913, the large prize-fund attracted European teams and racers, and the race was won by Jules Goux in a Peugeot.

Rule changes 

During the 1913 race, Jules Goux and his riding mechanic had drunk  pints of champagne, during each of his pit stops. For 1914, the consumption of alcohol during the race was banned. Riding mechanics were mandatory for the 1914 race.

Report

Elimination trials 

There were 45 entrants for the race, but only the quickest 30 drivers during the elimination trials would qualify for the race. The first day of trials was completed on the Monday before the race, 25 May. Caleb Bragg set the fastest official time on the first day, recording 1:36.8, though it was reckoned that Howdy Wilcox went quicker, but his time was not officially recorded. Ralph DePalma, a crowd favourite, struggled in his Mercedes and could only manage a quickest time of 1:47.4, slower than the 1:45 that it was predicted drivers would have to beat in order to qualify. Only fifteen of the drivers ran on the first day, and they continued with two sessions on the Tuesday. On the second day, three drivers set record times around the Speedway: first the 1912 winner, Joe Dawson, set an unofficial lap time of 1:34.8. Later in the day Teddy Tetzlaff completed a lap in 1:33.4, while Jules Goux finished the day as the fastest driver, with a time of 1:31.7. Tetzlaff's lap was completed in a Maxwell which was fuelled with a 50:50 mix of gasoline and kerosene; the other Maxwell, driven by Billy Carlson, set a time of 1:36.6 fuelled by a combination of kerosene and lucubrating oil, with no gasoline. Ray Harroun, who had won the inaugural Indianapolis 500 in 1911, designed the Maxwell car, and was given $10,000 by the company's president as a reward for the cars qualifying with sub-1:37 times.

By the end of the second day, 21 drivers had completed speed trials, and all but DePalma and Eddie Pullen had times below 1:45. Hughie Hughes's car suffered a broken crank case, preventing him from being able to set a qualifying time. On the final day of the trials, DePalma managed to make significant improvements in his Mercedes, and qualified with the twentieth fastest time overall, in 1:42.12. Georges Boillot set the overall fastest time, edging out his teammate Goux by completing a lap in 1:30.13, exceeding  along the straights. The slowest of the thirty qualifiers was Harry Grant in a Sunbeam, with a lap time of 1:44.09.

Build up 

After the rigours of the elimination trials, DePalma withdrew from the race, claiming that his car had been vibrating so heavily that his engine would not survive the race. His place was taken by Ray Gilhooley in the Italian-built Isotta car. Gilhooley was known as a fearless, and sometimes erratic, driver who was feared by his peers, as they considered him unpredictable. DePalma claimed that he had twice seen Gilhooley "tear through a wooden fence at full tilt" on occasions when Gilhooley risked overtakes on dangerous corners. The bookmakers made the 1913 race winner, Goux, the favourite, followed by his Peugeot teammate Boillot. Although the Frenchmen were accepted to be driving the quickest cars, there was some belief in the American press that their English tires might not be as durable as American tires, which could improve the chances of the American drivers.

Race

Classification

Elimination trials

Race results

Gallery

Notes

References

Bibliography

External links 

 1914 Indianapolis 500 France v America at AutoGiftGarage.com
 

Indianapolis 500 races
Indianapolis 500
Indianapolis 500
Indianapolis 500
Indianapolis 500